Nano-Micro Letters is a peer-reviewed open-access scientific journal covering nanotechnology. It is published by Springer Science+Business Media on behalf of Shanghai Jiao Tong University. The editor-in-chief is Yafei Zhang (Shanghai Jiao Tong University). The journal was established in 2009.

Abstracting and indexing
The journal is abstracted and indexed in the Science Citation Index Expanded and Scopus. According  to the Journal Citation Reports, the journal has a 2020 impact factor of 1 6.419.

References

External links

English-language journals
Springer Science+Business Media academic journals
Creative Commons Attribution-licensed journals
Publications established in 2009
Shanghai Jiao Tong University
Nanotechnology journals